The 2018 Belgian Figure Skating Championships took place between 1 and 2 December 2017 in Liedekerke. Skaters competed in the disciplines of men's singles and ladies' singles across the levels of senior, junior, advanced novice, as well as the age-group levels of minime/miniem A, B, and C. There were no competitors in the senior men's event as Jorik Hendrickx withdrew.

Senior results

Ladies

Junior results

Men 1 (U19)

Men 2 (U17)

Ladies 1 (U19)

Ladies 2 (U17)

External links
 SkateBelgium
 

Belgian Figure Skating Championships
Belgian Figure Skating Championships, 2018
2017 in figure skating